The 2004–05 ULEB Cup was the third season of the second-tier level European professional club basketball competition, the EuroCup, which is organized by the Euroleague Basketball Company. The season started on November 9, 2004, and officially ended on April 19, 2005. The second-tier level EuroCup is the European-wide league level that is one tier below the EuroLeague level. Lietuvos rytas won the trophy, by defeating Makedonikos in the final, by a score of 78–74.

Teams

Format
Each group contained 6 teams. There were 7 groups. Each team would play amongst each group twice. Top 2 teams from groups A, C, E, F, and G qualify to eighthfinals. Top 3 teams from groups B and D also qualify to the eighthfinals.

In eighthfinals, each team plays against their selected team twice. The winner of the two games with a higher combined score qualifies to quarterfinals. This procedure repeats in quarterfinals and in semifinals.

Regular season

Group G

Top 16 

|}

Quarterfinals 

|}

Semifinals 

|}

Finals 
April 19, Spiroudome, Charleroi

|}

Finals MVP
  Robertas Javtokas (Lietuvos rytas)

External links
ULEB Cup 2004-05 on Eurocupbasketball.com

 
Uleb
EuroCup Basketball seasons